The 1877 Wilton by-election was fought on 19 February 1877.  The byelection was fought due to the resignation of the incumbent Liberal MP, Sir Edmund Antrobus.  It was won by the Conservative candidate Hon. Sidney Herbert.

References

1877 elections in the United Kingdom
1877 in England
By-elections to the Parliament of the United Kingdom in Wiltshire constituencies
19th century in Wiltshire